The Company Law of the People's Republic of China is a law which was passed by the National People's Congress of the PRC on 29 December 1993 and came into force on 1 July 1994. It has been amended several times since then. The most current version of the law took effect in 2018. The law regulates limited liability and joint stock companies.

The main purpose of the law is stated in Article 1, "The Company Law of the People's Republic of China (hereinafter referred to as the "Law") has been enacted in order to standardize the organization and activities of companies, protect the lawful rights and interests of companies, shareholders and creditors, safeguard the social and economic order and promote the development of the socialist market economy."

Article 108 states that "A company limited by shares shall have a board of directors of five to 19 members."

Contents
The Company Law contains 13 chapters and 218 articles. The chapters deal with the following topics: 

Chapter I: General Provisions

Chapter II: Establishment and Organizational Structure of Limited Liability Companies

Chapter III: Transfer of Equity Interests in Limited Liability Companies

Chapter IV: Establishment and Organizational Structure of Companies Limited By Shares

Chapter V: Issuance and Transfer of Shares in Companies Limited by Shares

Chapter VI: Qualifications and Obligations of Directors, Supervisors and Senior Officers of Companies

Chapter VII: Corporate Bonds

Chapter VIII: Financial Affairs and Accounting of Companies

Chapter Ix: Merger and Division, Increase and Reduction of Capital of Companies

Chapter X: Dissolution and Liquidation of Companies

Chapter XI: Branches of Foreign Companies

Chapter XII: Legal Liability

Chapter XIII: Supplementary Provisions.

References

Corporate law
Laws of China